Palazzo Mangiapane or Palace of Two Towers (Palazzo de Due Torri) or Palazzo Navager is a Gothic style palace located on the Riva degli Schiavoni #4145 in the sestiere of Castello, Venice, adjacent to the Ponte del Sepolcro, previously called the Bridge of Ca'Navager. It is best known for being the home, for about five years, of the poet Petrarch.

History
The palace originally belonged to the Navager or Navagero family; their heraldic shield is sculpted on the well in the interior courtyard. In some land and houses bought in 1483 from monks from San Michele in Isola and Sant'Andrea d'Ammiana. This palace was the home of the historian Andrea Navagero, and a grandson also named Andrea (1483–1529), statesman, poet, historian and botanist of Venice, who died in Bles, while ambassador to France. It still owned by Pietro Navagero, who died in 1743, the last male of the Navagero name. The area once had a monastery of the Sepulchre, a building with two towers.

House of Petrarch
The palace is also known as the local Casa de Petrarca. It is where Petrarch's daughter Francesca and her husband Francescuolo da Brossano lived with their family along with the famous poet 1362–1367.

The idea of living in Venice came to Petrarch through his deep admiration for it. He considered it the miracle of civitas. Petrarch had many friends from Venice, especially in the chancellery. One very special Venetian friend of diplomatic rank was Grand Chancellor Benintendi de Ravagnani. He helped establish an early endowment for the Library of St. Mark by leaving material from Petrarch's library for the archive.

References 

Republic of Venice
Molina
World Heritage Sites in Italy
Venetian Gothic architecture